Henry Amike (born 4 October 1961) is a retired Nigerian athlete who specialized in the 400 metres hurdles.

Achievements

External links

1961 births
Living people
Nigerian male hurdlers
Athletes (track and field) at the 1984 Summer Olympics
Athletes (track and field) at the 1988 Summer Olympics
Athletes (track and field) at the 1990 Commonwealth Games
Olympic athletes of Nigeria
Commonwealth Games competitors for Nigeria
African Games bronze medalists for Nigeria
African Games medalists in athletics (track and field)
Universiade medalists in athletics (track and field)
Athletes (track and field) at the 1987 All-Africa Games
Universiade silver medalists for Nigeria
20th-century Nigerian people